Havran Dam is a dam in the agricultural province of Balıkesir, Turkey. The development was backed by the Turkish State Hydraulic Works. A large cave located in the dam reservoir was home to 15–20,000 bats, making it the second largest such colony in the country. Because these creatures are important to the local agriculture, the pumping operation for the dam was delayed until April, 2008 when the bats ended their hibernation.

See also
List of dams and reservoirs in Turkey

References

DSI directory , State Hydraulic Works (Turkey), Retrieved December 16, 2009

Dams in Balıkesir Province